Mara Dyrce Abrantes da Silva Santos, better known as Mara Abrantes (31 May 1934 – 28 April 2021) was a Brazilian-Portuguese singer and actress known for the films A Canção da Saudade and Malandros em Quarta Dimensão.

References

20th-century Portuguese women singers
20th-century Brazilian women singers
20th-century Brazilian singers
1934 births
2021 deaths
People from Rio de Janeiro (city)

Portuguese people of Brazilian descent